Wellington School may refer to:

 The Wellington School in Columbus, Ohio, United States
 Wellington School, Bebington, Merseyside, England
 Wellington School, Ayr, Scotland
 Wellington School, Somerset, England
 Wellington School, Midlothian, Scotland
 Wellington School, Timperley, Greater Manchester, England
 Wellington School, Shropshire, the former name of Wrekin College
 Wellington School, an alternative name for the Wellington Group of New Zealand poets

See also
 Wellington College (disambiguation)